Peter Hall is a former association football player who represented New Zealand at international level.

Born in England, Hall emigrated after the war, initially to Australia, but quickly decided New Zealand was more to his liking. He played three official A-international matches for his adopted country in 1948, all against visiting trans-Tasman neighbours Australia, the first a 0–7 loss on 28 August, followed by 0-4 and 1-8 losses on 4 September and 9 September respectively.

References 

Year of birth missing (living people)
Living people
New Zealand association footballers
New Zealand international footballers
Association footballers not categorized by position